The RML 12-inch 25-ton guns were large rifled muzzle-loading guns of mid-late 1800s used as primary armament on British ironclad turret battleships and coastal monitors, and also ashore for coast defence. They were the shorter and less powerful of the two 12-inch (305-mm) British RML guns, the other being the 35-ton gun.

Design

Mark I 
Four guns were first made in 1866 with a toughened mild steel tube surrounded by multiple wrought iron coils on the original Armstrong pattern.

Mark II 
While strong, the multiple coils were considered too expensive for construction in quantity. From 1867 guns were built on the simplified and hence cheaper "Fraser" system involving fewer but larger coils similar to the 10-inch (254-mm) Mk II gun. The guns were not considered a success, with the rifling twist of 1 in 100 increasing to 1 in 50 considered insufficient for accuracy, and guns were retubed in 11-inch (279-mm) calibre when their bores wore out.

Naval service 
Guns were mounted on :
  : 4
  : 4
  : 2
  : 2
  : 4
  : 4

Ammunition 
When the gun was first introduced projectiles had several rows of "studs" which engaged with the gun's rifling to impart spin. Some time after 1878, "attached gas-checks" were fitted to the bases of the studded shells, reducing wear on the guns and improving their range and accuracy. Subsequently, "automatic gas-checks" were developed which could rotate shells, allowing the deployment of a new range of studless ammunition. Thus, any particular gun potentially operated with a mix of studded and studless ammunition.

The gun's primary projectile was 600 to 608-pound (272- to 275-kilogram) "Palliser" armour-piercing shot, fired with a "Battering charge" of 85 pounds (38.5 kilograms) of "P" (gunpowder) or 67 pounds (30.4 kilograms) "R.L.G." (gunpowder) for maximum velocity and hence penetrating power. Shrapnel and Common (exploding) shells weighed 497 pounds (225.5 kilograms) and were fired with a "Full charge" of 55 pounds (25 kilograms) "P" or 50 pounds (22.7 kilograms) "R.L.G.".

See also 
 List of naval guns

Surviving examples 
 at Drake's Island, Plymouth, UK

Notes and references

Bibliography 
 Treatise on Ammunition. War Office, UK, 1877
 Treatise on the construction and manufacture of ordnance in the British service. War Office, UK, 1877
 Text Book of Gunnery, 1887. LONDON : PRINTED FOR HIS MAJESTY'S STATIONERY OFFICE, BY HARRISON AND SONS, ST. MARTIN'S LANE 
 Sir Thomas Brassey, The British Navy, Volume II. London: Longmans, Green and Co. 1882

External links 

Naval guns of the United Kingdom
305 mm artillery
Victorian-era weapons of the United Kingdom
Coastal artillery